Trust Your Instincts is the fifth album by Count Basic released in 2000

Track listing

"Don't Wanna Wait" - 3:29
"Richest Woman" - 3:54
"Who's Gonna Wipe My Teardrops Away" - 4:00
"One One 4" - 4:57
"Someday" - 3:45
"I'm Loving You" - 4:14
"Living For The City" - 4:42
"Heavy Dose" - 3:52
"Where Did Our Love Go" - 3:42
"Remember This" - 4:25
"Rise & Fall" - 4:22
"Trust Your Instincts" - 4:10

Count Basic albums
2000 albums